In environmental accounting, defensive expenditures are expenditures that seek to minimise potential damage to oneself.  Examples include defence and insurance.

References

Risk management
Actuarial science
Environmental economics
Expenditure